Austin Knudsen (born 1980/1981) is an American lawyer and politician serving as the Attorney General of Montana. He formerly served as the Speaker of the Montana House of Representatives from 2015 to 2019. During his time in the Montana House from 2010 to 2018, he represented House District 36, which includes the Culbertson area.

Early life and education 
Knudsen was raised in Culbertson, Montana. He earned a Bachelor of Science in sociology and Bachelor of Arts in political science from Montana State University. He then earned a Juris Doctor from the Alexander Blewett III School of Law at the University of Montana.

Career 
Knudsen was elected to the Montana House of Representatives in 2010 and took office in 2011. From 2015 to 2019, Knudsen served as the Speaker of the Montana House.

In a 2016 op-ed in The Montana Standard, Knudsen expressed opposition to President Barack Obama's policy regarding allowing Syrian refugees to enter the United States. In an op-ed, Knudsen cited his grandfather's immigration from Denmark and claimed that Syrian refugees were not required to assimilate to American culture, and that "Much of this Muslim culture is foreign and strange to us."

Knudsen was unable to seek re-election to the House in 2018 due to term limits.

Legislation 
In 2017, Knudsen authored a number of pieces of legislation. He introduced bills to:
 Provide loans to owners of coal-fired generating units
 Revise laws related to boycotts of Israel
 Revise oil and gas lease provisions
 Clarify that property owners are not liable for firefighters' actions

Attorney General of Montana

In May 2019, Knudsen announced his candidacy for Attorney General of Montana in the 2020 election. Knudsen defeated Jon Bennion, the state deputy Attorney General, in the Republican primary. He defeated Raph Graybill in the November general election.

Electoral history

Personal life 
Knudsen is of Danish descent.

References

External links
 

|-

American people of Danish descent
Living people
Montana Attorneys General
People from Roosevelt County, Montana
Place of birth missing (living people)
Speakers of the Montana House of Representatives
Republican Party members of the Montana House of Representatives
University of Montana alumni
Year of birth missing (living people)